Krasnogorsk may refer to one of the following:
Krasnogorsk Urban Settlement, a municipal formation which the City of Krasnogorsk in Krasnogorsky District of Moscow Oblast, Russia is incorporated as
Krasnogorsk, Russia, several inhabited localities in Russia
Krasnogorsk, Uzbekistan, a town in Tashkent Province of Uzbekistan
Krasnogorsk (camera), a Soviet brand of film camera
Krasnogorsk, a Soviet ZX Spectrum computer clone

See also
 Krasnogorsky (disambiguation)
 Krasnaya Gora